Toyin Ibitoye is a Nigerian sports analyst and journalist who currently works for Channels TV. An alumnus of the University of Ibadan and the Nelson Mandela Metropolitan University, Toyin was on March 18, 2015 appointed as Media Officer to the Nigeria national football team by the Nigeria Football Federation.

Accolades
2013 Nigerian Broadcasters Merit Awards – Most Popular TV Sports Presenter (Male)
1st Nigeria Pitch Awards – Football Journalist of the Year (TV)
2nd Nigeria Pitch Awards – Football Journalist of the Year (TV)

References

Year of birth missing (living people)
Living people
Nigerian sports journalists
University of Ibadan alumni
Nelson Mandela University alumni